Ogarev is a rural locality (a khutor) in Krasnoflotskoye Rural Settlement, Petropavlovsky District, Voronezh Oblast, Russia. The population was 1,069 as of 2010. There are 4 streets.

Geography 
Ogarev is located 42 km east of Petropavlovka (the district's administrative centre) by road. Krasnoflotskoye is the nearest rural locality.

References 

Rural localities in Petropavlovsky District, Voronezh Oblast